Acraea speciosa is a butterfly in the family Nymphalidae. It is found in Angola and Zambia.

Description
Very close to Acraea anacreon q.v for diagnosis

Taxonomy
It is a member of the Acraea rahira species group.-   but see also Pierre & Bernaud, 2014

References

Butterflies described in 1909
speciosa